Nikolai Sulima (1777-1840) was a Russian statesman and military commander, a General of the Imperial Russian Army during Napoleonic Wars and the November Uprising. A distant descendant of hetman Ivan Sulyma and numerous Polish noble families, he joined the army early in his life.

He was taken prisoner in the Battle of Austerlitz, but was exchanged for a French officer soon afterwards. During the Russian campaign against Poland in 1831 he took part in the Battle of Warsaw. Named governor of Eastern Siberia and then Western Siberia in 1833, in 1836 he was recalled back to Sankt Petersburg where he joined the State Control Council. He died in 1840. Peter Kropotkin was his grandson, through his daughter Ekaterina Nikolaevna Sulima.

Imperial Russian Army generals
Politicians of the Russian Empire
1777 births
1840 deaths